The 1951 Humboldt State Lumberjacks football team represented Humboldt State College during the 1951 college football season. Humboldt State competed in the Far Western Conference (FWC).

The 1951 Lumberjacks were led by first-year head coach Phil Sarboe. They played home games at the Redwood Bowl in Arcata, California. Humboldt State finished with a record of four wins, three losses and one tie (4–3–1, 2–1 FWC). The Lumberjacks outscored their opponents 177–98 for the season. Under coach Sarboe, the 1951 season was a big turnaround for Humboldt State. They finished above .500, after not winning a game in either of the previous two seasons. Sarboe would coach the team for the next 15 years and only had one losing season.

Schedule

Notes

References

Humboldt State
Humboldt State Lumberjacks football seasons
Humboldt State Lumberjacks football